Morgan Ellis (born April 30, 1992) is a Canadian professional ice hockey defenceman. He is currently playing under contract with Eisbären Berlin of the Deutsche Eishockey Liga (DEL). Ellis was selected by the Montreal Canadiens in the 4th round (117th overall) of the 2010 NHL Entry Draft.

Playing career
Ellis played four seasons (2008 – 2012) of major junior hockey in the Quebec Major Junior Hockey League (QMJHL), scoring 27 goals and 96 assists for 123 points, while earning 222 penalty minutes, in 237 QMJHL games. He was recognized for his outstanding performance during the 2011–12 season when he was selected to receive the Kevin Lowe Trophy as the league's best defensive defenceman, and was also named to the 2011–12 QMJHL Second All-Star Team. Ellis, who played the majority of his career with the Cape Breton Screaming Eagles, was traded to the Shawinigan Cataractes in December 2011, and would help them capture the 2012 Memorial Cup that following April.

Ellis was drafted 117th overall by the Montreal Canadiens in the 2010 NHL Entry Draft. On March 1, 2012, Ellis was signed to a three-year entry-level contract. He was assigned to play the 2012–13 season in the American Hockey League with the Hamilton Bulldogs where he skated in 71 games, registering 4 goals and 4 assists for 8 points, along with 57 penalty minutes, in his first professional season.

On June 1, 2015, Ellis was signed to a one-year, two-way contract extension by the Canadiens. On January 27, 2016, Eliis was named to represent the North Division roster for the AHL All-Star Game as part of the Canadiens AHL affiliate the St. John's IceCaps.

On February 26, 2016, Ellis was recalled by the Canadiens and played in his first NHL game on March 2, 2016, in a 3–2 shootout loss to the Anaheim Ducks at the Honda Center. He would play two additional games before being reassigned to the IceCaps on March 6, 2016.

On July 2, 2016, having left the Canadiens organization as a free agent, Ellis agreed to a one-year, two-way deal with the St. Louis Blues. After competing in the Blues 2016 training camp, Ellis was assigned to AHL affiliate, the Chicago Wolves for the duration of the 2016–17 season.

As an impending unrestricted free agent, after the conclusion of the Wolves post-season exit, Ellis opted to sign his first contract abroad in agreeing to a one-year deal with Swedish club, Skellefteå AIK of the Swedish Hockey League, on May 15, 2017. He split the 2017–18 season, between SAIK and Färjestad BK, posting 10 points in 49 games combined.

As a free agent, Ellis moved to the Deutsche Eishockey Liga, agreeing to a one-year contract with German outfit Kölner Haie, on May 9, 2018.

Ellis continued his journeyman European career, signing a one-year contract for the 2019–20 season with Russian club, HC Sochi of the KHL, on May 2, 2019. As a free agent at the conclusion of his contract in Sochi, Ellis continued in the KHL by securing a one-year deal with Latvian-based club, Dinamo Riga, on August 3, 2020.

In the 2020–21 season, Ellis began the year as an alternate captain with Riga, posting 1 goal and 3 points through 17 games. On November 30, 2020, Ellis left the KHL and returned to Germany after signing for the remainder of the season with ERC Ingolstadt of the DEL.

Career statistics

Regular season and playoffs

International

Awards and honours

References

External links

1992 births
Canadian expatriate ice hockey players in Sweden
Canadian ice hockey defencemen
Cape Breton Screaming Eagles players
Chicago Wolves players
Dinamo Riga players
Eisbären Berlin players
ERC Ingolstadt players
Färjestad BK players
Hamilton Bulldogs (AHL) players
HC Sochi players
Ice hockey people from Prince Edward Island
Kölner Haie players
Living people
Montreal Canadiens draft picks
Montreal Canadiens players
Shawinigan Cataractes players
Skellefteå AIK players
Sportspeople from Prince Edward Island
St. John's IceCaps players
Wheeling Nailers players
Ice hockey players at the 2022 Winter Olympics
Olympic ice hockey players of Canada